is a Japanese horror manga artist who wrote and illustrated , ,  and . The last was adapted in 2010 as a feature movie as Big Tits Zombie.

Style

Many of Rei's works involve themes of powerful (and sometimes psychotic) female casts that serve as both protagonists and antagonists. He also appears to take influences from female wrestlers and warriors along with using dark humor and ero guro themed humor.

Works
 Reiko the Zombie Shop
 Big Tits Dragon
 Satanister
 Chimamire Sukeban Chainsaw:   Adapted into live-action film in 2016
 Bijo Amanda
 Majonna
 , 2017
 Chimamire Sukeban Chainsaw: reflesh

References

Living people
Manga artists from Hiroshima Prefecture
1974 births